Jason Willinger (born February 2, 1972) is an American actor, who is known for providing the voice of Robbie Sinclair in the television sitcom Dinosaurs. He also provided additional voices for the film A Goofy Movie.

Willinger has also co-starred in the 1992 film Zebrahead and guest-starred in the television sitcoms Cybill and Champs. In 2006, Willinger was the narrator for the reality television series Everest: Beyond the Limit and in Cesar 911.

Filmography

References

External links

1971 births
Living people
Place of birth missing (living people)
20th-century American male actors
21st-century American male actors
American male film actors
American male television actors
American male voice actors